Cohen Williams "Laddie" Renfroe (born May 9, 1962) is a former Major League Baseball pitcher. Renfroe pitched with a sidearm delivery and appeared primarily as a relief pitcher and closer throughout his nine-year professional career.

Career
Renfroe pitched for the University of Mississippi, where he set a school record for the most wins during his career.  While in college, he experimented with a sidearm delivery, which he eventually adopted permanently. In 1982, he played collegiate summer baseball with the Cotuit Kettleers of the Cape Cod Baseball League. He was drafted by the Chicago Cubs in the 25th round of the 1984 Major League Baseball June Amateur Draft, and began the  season with the Geneva Cubs.

He was called up to the Chicago Cubs on July 2, and made his Major League debut the following day at Wrigley Field against the Pittsburgh Pirates.  He ultimately appeared in four games as a relief pitcher with Chicago, finishing with a 0–1 win–loss record and a 13.50 ERA.  He returned to Iowa on July 25.

In September  as a member of the Iowa Cubs, he was injured when struck in the head by an errant baseball.  The resultant head trauma caused him speech and vision problems, and he retired thereafter, in part because of sustained complications from the injury.

Personal life
Renfroe played soccer, football, and baseball in at Nashua High School in Nashua, New Hampshire.  He pitched two no-hitters in high school and led his team to the state championship in 1979.  After retiring, he coached baseball and soccer and relocated to Olive Branch, Mississippi.

References

External links

Major League Baseball pitchers
Chicago Cubs players
Geneva Cubs players
Peoria Chiefs players
Winston-Salem Spirits players
Iowa Cubs players
Pittsfield Cubs players
Charlotte Knights players
Cotuit Kettleers players
Baseball players from Mississippi
1962 births
Living people
Sportspeople from Natchez, Mississippi
People from Olive Branch, Mississippi
Ole Miss Rebels baseball players